Jana Novotná defeated Nathalie Tauziat in the final, 6–4, 7–6(7–2) to win the ladies' singles tennis title at the 1998 Wimbledon Championships. It was her first win in a Wimbledon final, following two previous runner-up finishes.

Martina Hingis was the defending champion, but lost in the semifinals to Novotná in a rematch of the previous year's final.

The final marked the first time in the Open Era that neither of the Wimbledon finalists had won a major previously, and the first time this scenario had happened at any major since the 1980 Australian Open.

Seeds

  Martina Hingis (semifinals)
  Lindsay Davenport (quarterfinals)
  Jana Novotná (champion)
  Steffi Graf (third round)
  Arantxa Sánchez Vicario (quarterfinals)
  Monica Seles (quarterfinals)
  Venus Williams (quarterfinals)
  Conchita Martínez (third round)
  Amanda Coetzer (second round)
  Irina Spîrlea (fourth round)
  Mary Pierce (first round)
  Anna Kournikova (withdrew)
  Patty Schnyder (second round)
  Sandrine Testud (fourth round)
  Dominique Van Roost (fourth round)
  Nathalie Tauziat (final)

Anna Kournikova withdrew due to a thumb injury. She was replaced in the draw by lucky loser Lilia Osterloh.

Qualifying

Draw

Finals

Top half

Section 1

Section 2

Section 3

Section 4

Bottom half

Section 5

Section 6

Section 7

Section 8

References

External links

1998 Wimbledon Championships on WTAtennis.com
1998 Wimbledon Championships – Women's draws and results at the International Tennis Federation

Women's Singles
Wimbledon Championship by year – Women's singles
Wimbledon Championships
Wimbledon Championships